The Assistant Secretary of Defense for Energy, Installations, and Environment (ASD(EI&E)), formerly known as the Deputy Under Secretary of Defense for Installations and Environment (DUSD(I&E)), provides management and oversight of military installations worldwide and manages environmental, safety, and occupational health programs for the Department of Defense (DoD). The responsibilities of the ASD(EI&E) include the development of installation capabilities, programs, and budgets; installation-energy programs and policy; base realignment and closure; privatization of military housing and utilities; and integration of environmental needs into the weapons acquisition process. The ASD(EI&E) is also responsible for environmental management, safety and occupational health; environmental restoration at active and closing bases; conservation of natural and cultural resources; pollution prevention; environmental research and technology; fire protection; and explosives safety. The ASD(EI&E) reports to the Under Secretary of Defense for Acquisition, Technology and Logistics, and is a part of the Office of the Secretary of Defense.

History

Responsibility over installations and environmental affairs at the Defense Department was spread out across a variety of positions over time. Oversight for installations has been lumped together in the past with manpower, acquisition, and logistics functions (see, for example, the history of the Assistant Secretary of Defense for Logistics and Materiel Readiness and the Assistant Secretary of Defense for Force Management Policy). For a brief period in the mid-1990s, the Assistant Secretary of Defense for Economic Security had oversight for installations and the base realignment and closure (BRAC) program, in addition to DoD policy in the areas of industrial affairs, dual-use technology, international cooperation programs, and community economic adjustment. On April 5, 1996, the DoD nullified Defense Directive 5134.7 (signed August 21, 1995), thereby abolishing the ASD(Economic Security) while noting that this position has served the "purpose for which it was intended and is no longer required." Responsibility for installations then migrated to the Deputy Under Secretary of Defense for Installations.

Oversight for environmental affairs was linked together with health affairs for many years (see, for example, the Assistant Secretary of Defense for Health Affairs). In 2001, the responsibilities for installation and environment functions were merged into a single office. This office is not one of the five Principal Deputy Under Secretaries of Defense authorized by law, as articulated in the National Defense Authorization Act of 2010. Thus, DoD is statutorily obligated to re-designate this office in the near future, similar to the recent re-designation of the Deputy Under Secretaries of Defense within the Under Secretary of Defense for Personnel and Readiness.

As part of a reorganization on February 1, 2018, the ASD(EI&E) was abolished and combined with the Assistant Secretary of Defense for Logistics and Materiel Readiness to form a new Assistant Secretary of Defense for Sustainment. The ASD(EI&E) was reestablished on February 10, 2022.

Officeholders 

The table below includes both the various titles of this post over time, as well as all the holders of those offices.

References 

 
Energy